Pakke Tiger Reserve, also known as Pakhui Tiger Reserve, is a Project Tiger reserve in the East Kameng district of Arunachal Pradesh in Northeast India. The  reserve is protected by the Department of Environment and Forest of Arunachal Pradesh. In a notification (CWL/D/26/94/1393-1492) dated Itanagar 19 April 2001, issued by the Principal Secretary, the Governor of Arunachal Pradesh renamed Pakhui Wildlife Sanctuary as Pakke Wildlife Sanctuary Division.

This Tiger Reserve has won India Biodiversity Award 2016 in the category of 'Conservation of threatened species' for its Hornbill Nest Adoption Programme.

Location
It is bounded by Bhareli or Kameng River in the west and north, and by Pakke River in the east. It is surrounded by contiguous forests on most sides.
Towards the south and south-east, the sanctuary adjoins reserve forests and Assam's Nameri National Park. Selective logging on a commercial scale occurred in the reserve forests until 1996.

The main perennial streams in the area are the Nameri, Khari and Upper Dikorai. West of Kameng River are Sessa Orchid Sanctuary and Eaglenest Wildlife Sanctuary.

History
The area of Pakke Tiger Reserve was initially constituted as Pakhui Reserve Forest on 1 July 1966 and declared a game reserve on 28 March 1977. In 2001, it was renamed Pakhui Wildlife Sanctuary and became Pakhui Tiger Reserve on 23 April 2002 as the 26th Tiger Reserve under Project Tiger of the National Tiger Conservation Authority.

Geography
The terrain is rugged with mountainous ranges in the north and narrow plains and sloping hill valleys in the south. The sanctuary slopes southwards towards the river valley of the Brahmaputra River. The area of Brahmaputra and Chittagong Hills, which includes Pakke and Namdapha Tiger Reserve, is the north-western limit of the Indochinese tiger's range, bordering the eastern limit of the Bengal tiger's range.

Climate
Pakke Tiger Reserve has a subtropical climate with cold weather from November to March. It receives rainfall predominantly from the south-west monsoon in May to September and north-east monsoon from November to April. October and November are relatively dry. Winds are generally of moderate velocity. Thunderstorms occasionally occur in March–April. The average annual rainfall is 2500 mm. May and June are the hottest months. Humidity levels reach 80% during the summer.

Flora
The habitat types are lowland semi-evergreen, evergreen forest and Eastern Himalayan broadleaf forests. A total of 343 woody species of flowering plants (angiosperms) have been recorded from the lowland areas of the park, with a high representation of species from the families Euphorbiaceae and Lauraceae, but at least 1500 species of vascular plants are expected from Pakhui WLS, of which 500 species would be woody. While about 600 species of orchids are reported from Arunachal Pradesh, Pakhui WLS and adjoining areas also harbour many orchid species. The forest has a typical layered structure and the major emergent species are Bhelu Tetrameles nudiflora, Borpat Ailanthus grandis and Jutuli Altingia excelsa.

The general vegetation type of the entire tract is classified as Assam Valley tropical semi-evergreen forest. The forests are multi-storeyed and rich in epiphytic flora and woody lianas. The vegetation is dense, with a high diversity and density of woody lianas and climbers. The forest types include tropical semi-evergreen forests along the lower plains and foothills dominated by Kari Polyalthia simiarum, Hatipehala Pterospermum acerifolium, Karibadam Sterculia alata, Paroli Stereospermum chelonioides, Ailanthus grandis and Khokun Duabanga grandiflora. The tropical semi-evergreen forests are scattered along the lower plains and foothills, dominated by Altingia excelsa, Nahar Mesua ferrea, Banderdima Dysoxylum binectariferum, Beilschmedia sp. and other middle storey trees belonging to the Lauraceae and Myrtaceae. These forests have a large number of species of economic value. Subtropical broadleaved forests of the Fagaceae and Lauraceae dominate the hill tops and higher reaches. Moist areas near streams have a profuse growth of bamboo, cane and palms. About eight species of bamboo occur in the area, in moist areas in gullies, in areas previously under settlements, or subjected to some form of disturbance on the hill slopes. At least 5 commercially important cane species grow in moist areas, along with Tokko Livistona jenkinsiana, a species used extensively by locals for thatching roofs. Along the larger perennial streams, there are shingle beds with patches of tall grassland, which give way to lowland moist forests with Outenga Dillenia indica and Boromthuri Talauma hodgsonii. Along the larger rivers, isolated trees of Semal Bombax ceiba and two species of Koroi Albizzia sp. are common.

These forests have a high percentage of tree species (64%) that are animal-dispersed, with 12% tree species being wind-dispersed.

Fauna
At least 40 mammal species occur in Pakhui Tiger Reserve (PTR). Three large cats - the Bengal tiger, Indian leopard and clouded leopard share space with two canids – the wild dog and Asiatic jackal. Among the herbivore species, elephant, barking deer, gaur, and sambar are most commonly encountered. The commonest monkeys are the Rhesus macaque, Assamese macaque and the capped langur. In addition, PTR is home to as many as sixteen  species of viverrids, weasels and mongooses. Commonly seen in pairs is the yellow-throated marten.

Notable mammals in the Tiger Reserve are: tiger, leopard, clouded leopard, jungle cat, wild dog, jackal, Himalayan black bear, binturong, elephant, gaur, sambar, hog deer, barking deer, wild boar, yellow-throated marten, Malayan giant squirrel, flying squirrel, squirrel, capped langur, rhesus macaque, Assamese macaque, gaur. The presence of stamp tailed macaques has been reported by one researcher.

At least 296 bird species have been recorded from PTR including the globally endangered white-winged wood duck, the unique ibisbill, and the rare Oriental bay owl. PTR is a good place to see hornbills. Roost sites of wreathed hornbills and great hornbill can be observed on the river banks.
Birds seen in Pakke Tiger Reserve include: Jerdon's baza, pied falconet, white-cheeked hill-partridge, grey peacock-pheasant, elwe's crake, ibisbill, Asian emerald cuckoo, red-headed trogon, green pigeon spp., forest eagle owl, wreathed hornbill, great hornbill, collared broadbill and long-tailed broadbill, blue-naped pitta, lesser shortwing, Himalayan shortwing, Daurian redstart, Leschenault's forktail, lesser necklaced laughing-thrush, silver-eared leiothrix, white-bellied yuhina, yellow-bellied flycatcher warbler, sultan tit, ruby-cheeked sunbird, maroon oriole, and crow-billed drongo.

Of the over 1500 butterfly species found in India, it is estimated that Pakke Tiger Reserve could be home to at least 500 species.

A total of 36 reptile species and 30 amphibian species have been reported in Pakke Tiger Reserve. The Assam roofed turtle, a highly endangered species, is commonly sighted. The king cobra is sometimes seen on the fringes of villages and is not uncommon within the park. The pied warty frog, resembling bird droppings, is also found here.

Park protection
Presently, there are 27 anti-poaching camps where 104 local youth and 20 gaon buras (village fathers) have been employed as forest watchers. A  road has been constructed to ease logistics and deter poachers. The people living around the park belong to the Nyishi community. The Ghora Aabhe (a group of village chiefs) and Women Self Help Groups help authorities in wildlife protection by providing information and enforcing customary laws. The Nyishi community has joined hands with civil society and the forest department to protect hornbill nests. The Nyishi tribe uses fiber glass replicas of hornbills beaks as their headgear and has fines for hunting of tigers, among other regulations.

The Ghora Aabhe Society (a group of village chiefs) was formed in 2006. A group of 12 village heads, along with the forest department, supports conservation efforts around Pakhui Tiger Reserve (PTR). Their work has been widely recognised, through several awards and articles in print media. The Ghora Aabhe enforce customary laws, institute penalties against hunting and logging, aid in capacity building and spread awareness of PTR.

See also
 Wildlife of India

Further reading
 Sarkar, P., Verma, S. and Menon, V. 2012. Food selection by Asian elephant (Elephas maximus). The Clarion-International Multidisciplinary Journal 1: 70-79.
 Velho, N., Ratnam, J., Srinivasan, U. and Sankaran, M.  2012.  Shifts in community structure of tropical trees and avian frugivores in forests recovering from past logging. Biological Conservation 153:32-40.
 Velho, N., Isvaran, K. and Datta, A. 2012. Rodent seed predation: effects on seed survival, recruitment, abundance and dispersion of bird-dispersed tropical trees. Oecologia 167:1-10.
 Velho, N., Srinivasan, U., Prashanth, N.S. and Laurance, W. 2011. Human disease hinders anti-poaching efforts in Indian nature reserves. Biological Conservation 144: 2382-2385
 Velho, N. and Krisnadas, M. 2011. Post-logging recovery of animal-dispersed trees in a tropical forest site in north-east India. Tropical Conservation Science 4: 405-419.
 Solanki, G.S. and  Kumar, A. 2010. Time budget and activities pattern of Capped langurs Trachypithecus Pileatus in Pakke wildlife sanctuary, Arunachal Pradesh, India. Journal of the Bombay Natural History Society, 107(2): 86-90
 Kumar, A., Solanki, G.S.  and Sharma, B.K.  2010. Zoo therapeutic use of capped langur in traditional healthcare and the market value: view from Western Arunachal Pradesh, India. In: S.C. Tiwari (Ed.), Ethnoforestry: The future of Indian forestry. Bishen Singh Mahendra Pal Singh, Dehradun, India, 524pp.
 Lasgorceix, A. and Kothari, A. 2009. Displacement and relocation of Protected Areas: a synthesis and analysis of case studies. Economic & Political Weekly 44: 37-47.
 Velho, N., Datta, A. and Isvaran, K. 2009. Effects of rodents on seed fates of hornbill-dispersed tree species in a tropical forest in north-east India. J. Tropical Ecology 25: 507-514.
 Kumar, A. and Solanki, G.S. 2009. Cattle-carnivore conflict: A case study of Pakke Tiger Reserve in Arunachal Pradesh, India. International Journal of Ecology and Environmental Sciences 35: 121-127.
 Sethi, P. and Howe, H. 2009. Recruitment of hornbill-dispersed trees in hunted and logged forests of the Indian Eastern Himalaya. Conservation Biology 23: 710-718.
 Solanki, G.S., Kumar, A. and  Sharma, B.K. Sharma. 2008b. Winter food selection and diet composition of capped langur Trachypithecus pileatus in Arunachal Pradesh, India. Tropical Ecology 49: 157-166.
 Datta, A., Naniwadekar, R. and Anand, M.O. 2008a. Diversity, abundance and conservation status of small carnivores in two Protected Areas in Arunachal Pradesh. Small Carnivore Conservation 39: 1-10.
 Datta, A. and Goyal, S.P. 2008b. Responses of diurnal tree squirrels to selective logging in western Arunachal Pradesh. Current Science 95: 895-902.
 Datta, A. and Rawat, G.S. 2008c.  Dispersal modes and spatial patterns of tree species in a tropical forest in Arunachal Pradesh, north-east India. Tropical Conservation Science 1 (3): 163-183.
 Kumar, A. and Solanki, G.S. 2008. Population status and conservation of capped langurs (Trachypithecus pileatus) in and around Pakhuil Wildlife Sanctuary, Arunachal Pradesh, India. Primate Conservation 23: 97-105.
 Solanki, G.S.,  Kumar, A. and  Sharma, B.K. 2008a. Feeding Ecology of Trachypithecus pileatus in India. International Journal of Primatology 29:173-182.
 Solanki, G.S.,  Kumar, A. and  Sharma, B.K. 2007. Reproductive strategies of Trachypithecus pileatus in Arunachal Pradesh, India. International Journal of Primatology 28: 1075-1083.
 Solanki, G.S. and Kumar, A. 2006. Study on aggressive behaviour in wild population of capped langur (Trachypithecus pileatus) in India. Proceeding of Zoological Society of India 6 (1):15-30.
 Kumar, A., Solanki, G.S. and Sharma, B.K. 2005. Observation on parturition behaviour of capped langur (Trachypithecus pileatus). Primates 46 (3):215-217.
 Solanki, G.S., Chongpi, B. and Kumar, A. 2004. Ethnology of the Nishi tribes and wildlife of Arunachal Pradesh. Arunachal Forest News 20: 74-86. 
 Birand, A. and Pawar, S. 2004. An ornithological survey in north-east India. Forktail 20: 15-24.
 Datta, A. and Rawat, G.S. 2004. Nest site selection and nesting success of hornbills in Arunachal Pradesh, north-east India. Bird Conservation International 14: 249-262.
 Kumar, A. and Solanki, G.S. 2004b. Ethno-sociological impact on Capped langur (Trachypithecus pileatus) and suggestions for conservation: a case study of reserve forest in Assam, India. Journal of Nature Conservation 16 (1): 107-113.
 Kumar, A. and Solanki, G.S. 2004a. A rare feeding observation on water lilies (Nymphaea Alba) by the capped langur, Trachypithecus pileatus. Folia Primatologica 75 (3):157-159.
 Datta, A. and Rawat, G.S. 2003. Foraging patterns of sympatric hornbills in the non-breeding season in Arunachal Pradesh, north-east India. Biotropica 35 (2): 208-218.
 Kumar, A. and Solanki, G.S. 2003. Food preference of Rhesus monkey Macaca mulatta during the pre-monsoon & monsoon season, Pakhui Wildlife Sanctuary Arunachal Pradesh. Zoo’s Print Journal 18 (8): 1172-1174.
 Padmawathe, R., Qureshi, Q. & Rawat, G. S. 2003. Effects of selective logging on vascular epiphyte diversity in a moist lowland forest of Eastern Himalaya, India. Biological Conservation, 119: 81-92.
 Datta, A. 2001. Pheasant abundance in selectively logged and unlogged forests of western Arunachal Pradesh, north-east India. J. Bombay nat. Hist. Soc. 97 (2): 177-183.
 Datta, A. 1998. Hornbill abundance in unlogged forest, selectively logged forest and a plantation in western Arunachal Pradesh. Oryx 32 (4): 285-294.

References

External links
 Map - Pakhui Tiger Reserve

Wildlife sanctuaries in Arunachal Pradesh
Tiger reserves of India
Pakke-Kessang district
Environment of Arunachal Pradesh
Protected areas established in 1966
1966 establishments in the North-East Frontier Agency